VLE may refer to:

Science and technology
 Vapor–liquid equilibrium, in thermodynamics and chemical engineering
 Virtual learning environment, in educational technology
 Maximum landing gear extended speed (VLE), a V speed in aviation
 Variable-length encoding, an information theory technique for assigning shorter encoding to more frequently-occurring sequences
 Variable-length encoding of an instruction set, as is used in a variable-length instruction set
 Variable-length, aka variable-width encoding

Other uses
 Universal Lithuanian Encyclopedia